Pagoda Grama Niladhari Division is a Grama Niladhari Division of the Sri Jayawardanapura Kotte Divisional Secretariat of Colombo District of Western Province, Sri Lanka. It has Grama Niladhari Division Code 519A.

Ananda Balika Vidyalaya, Kotte, Yachting Association of Sri Lanka, Ananda Sastralaya, Kotte, Jubilee Post, Nugegoda, Pita Kotte Gal Ambalama and Kotte Raja Maha Vihara are located within, nearby or associated with Pagoda.

Pagoda is a surrounded by the Pitakotte West, Nawala East, Nugegoda, Nugegoda West and Pagoda East Grama Niladhari Divisions.

Demographics

Ethnicity 

The Pagoda Grama Niladhari Division has a Sinhalese majority (91.3%). In comparison, the Sri Jayawardanapura Kotte Divisional Secretariat (which contains the Pagoda Grama Niladhari Division) has a Sinhalese majority (84.8%)

Religion 

The Pagoda Grama Niladhari Division has a Buddhist majority (81.4%). In comparison, the Sri Jayawardanapura Kotte Divisional Secretariat (which contains the Pagoda Grama Niladhari Division) has a Buddhist majority (77.1%)

Gallery

References 

Grama Niladhari Divisions of Kotte Divisional Secretariat